The Big Band (rereleased as The Big Band: A Tribute to Basie) is an album by American jazz organist Jimmy McGriff featuring performances recorded in 1966 and originally released on the Solid State label.

Reception
The Allmusic review by Scott Yanow stated "Matching the leader's powerful organ with a big band was a logical idea and one that would be successfully repeated quite a few times in the future".

Track listing
 "Hob Nail Boogie" (Buster Harding) - 2:28
 "Cherry Point" (Neal Hefti) - 3:57
 "Swingin' the Blues" (Count Basie, Eddie Durham) - 3:47
 "Cute" (Hefti) - 3:29
 "Every Day I Have the Blues" (Memphis Slim) - 4:07
 "Blues Go Away" (Ernie Wilkins) - 3:34
 "Avenue C" - 2:58
 "L'il Darlin'" (Hefti) - 4:32
 "Splanky" (Hefti) - 3:17
 "Slow But Sure" (Manny Albam) - 4:36

Personnel
Jimmy McGriff - organ
Jimmy Nottingham, Burt Collins, Markie Markowitz, Joe Newman - trumpet
J. J. Johnson, Wayne Andre, Dick Hixson - trombone
Tony Studd - bass trombone
Jerome Richardson, Frank Wess - alto saxophone
Budd Johnson, Frank Foster - tenor saxophone
Seldon Powell - baritone saxophone
Kenny Burrell, Thornell Schwartz - guitar
Richard Davis, Chet Amsterdam - bass
Grady Tate - drums
Manny Albam - arranger

References

Solid State Records (jazz label) albums
Jimmy McGriff albums
1966 albums
Albums produced by Sonny Lester
Albums arranged by Manny Albam